Adwitiya was a Bengali television series that was aired from 13 June 2011 to 2 March 2012 on Star Jalsha channel. It was the production of Ideas Creations and the concept was initialized by Prosenjit Chatterjee. The show was directed by Joydeep Mukherjee and the script was jointly written by Anuja Chattopadhyay and Kaushik Bhattacharya. The series was shot on the backdrop of Sunderbans. It starred Bengali actors Indrasish Roy, Sohini Sarkar, Gaurav Chakraborty in the lead roles. It won awards for Best Villain and Best Couple at Star Jalsha Paribar awards in 2012.

Storyline

Adwitiya revolves around a young girl who is a student of medical science. Due to the sudden demise of Adwitiya's father she has to forgo her studies to take up a job in a rural bank in the districts of Sunderban at Komoltoli. Komoltoli is a village headed and manipulated by the Chowdhury brothers, namely Rabikiran Chowdhury and Chandrakiran Chowdhury. While all seems fine from outside in the village, but inside, there goes a series of political and malicious activities controlled by the Chowdhury brothers. The people of the village are victimized by these practices but no-one fears to voice against the brothers of the Chowdhury family. Adwitiya enters the village and takes up the cudgels of putting the village on the path of progress, while discovering and untangling many puzzles lying beneath the darkness of Komoltoli.

Cast
Sohini Sarkar as Adwitiya Sen / Mumu
Indrasish Roy as Chandrakiran Chowdhury / Chaand
Gaurav Chakraborty as Rabikiran Chowdhury / Robi
Aparajita Adhya as Monimala / Monima
Mithu Chakraborty as Anuradha Sen (Adwitiya's Mother)
Surojit Bannerjee as Adrish Sen (Adwitiya's Father)
Vivaan Ghosh as Bihaan
Disha Ganguly as Bulbuli
Joydeep Mukherjee as Shovan / Daktar Babu
Anindita Bose as Indira Chowdhury / Ratri Mukherjee
Nabanita Mukherjee Das as Sukhalata / Sukhi
Animesh Bhadury as Master Moshai
Mrinal Banerjee as Bhiringi

References

Bengali-language television programming in India
Indian television soap operas
2011 Indian television series debuts
2012 Indian television series endings
Star Jalsha original programming